The 2019 Campeonato Mineiro was the 105th season of Mineiro's top professional football league. The competition began on January 19 and ended on April 3. Cruzeiro are the defending champions, having won their 37th title by defeating Atlético Mineiro.

Format

First stage 
The 2019 Módulo I first stage was played by 12 clubs in a single round-robin, with all teams playing each other once. The eight best-placed teams qualified for the final stage and the bottom two teams were relegated to the 2020 Módulo II.

The league also selects Minas Gerais's representatives in the Campeonato Brasileiro Série D and the Copa do Brasil. The three best-placed teams not already qualified for the 2019 seasons of the Série A, Série B or Série C, earn places in the 2020 Série D. The four best-placed teams qualify for the 2020 Copa do Brasil. Should a team qualify for the cup by other means, their entry is passed down to the next best-placed team.

Knockout stage 
The knockout stage was played between the 8 best-placed teams from the previous stage, with the quarterfinals played in a one-legged tie and the semifinals and finals played in a two-legged tie. The quarterfinals were hosted by the better placing team in the first stage. In the semifinals, the best-placed team in the first stage of each contest has the right to choose whether to play its home game in the first or second leg. The away goals rule is not in effect, and should two teams be level on aggregate after both legs, the team who placed better in the first stage advances.

Participating teams

First stage

Knockout stage

Bracket

Quarterfinals

Quarterfinal 1

Quarterfinal 2

Quarterfinal 3

Quarterfinal 4

Semifinals

Semifinal 1

Semifinal 2

Finals

Goalscorers

References

External links
 Campeonato Mineiro Official Website
 Rules of the Competition

Campeonato Mineiro seasons
Mineiro